Cat Swamp was an area of Providence, Rhode Island that remained undeveloped until the early 20th century. 

It was filled in and built on by civil engineer, John Freeman in 1915.

References

Geography of Providence, Rhode Island